The Granite Mountain/Speculator Mine disaster of June 8, 1917, occurred as a result of a fire in a copper mine, and was the most deadly event in underground hard rock mining in United States history. Most men died of suffocation underground as the fire consumed their oxygen; a total of 168 miners were killed. The Butte, Montana copper mines were at full wartime production to support the US in World War I. Miners had been seeking improved working conditions, as they were at high risk.

As part of a fire safety system, the mining company was installing an electric cable into the Granite Mountain mine. When a foreman with a carbide lamp tried to inspect the damage, he accidentally ignited the oil-soaked cloth insulation on the cable. The fire quickly climbed the cable, and turned the shaft into a chimney, igniting the timbers in the shaft and consuming oxygen in the mines.

A total of 168 miners died in the ensuing blaze, most from asphyxia. Some of the deceased did not die immediately; they survived for a day or two in the tunnels. Some left notes written while they waited in hopes of rescue. A few managed to barricade themselves behind bulkheads in the mine and were found after as long as 55 hours. The miners went out on strike to protest working conditions and the many deaths after the disaster.

A Granite Mountain Speculator Mine Memorial, honoring the miners killed in the fire, was later erected at the site. Some of the notes written by the miners can be viewed at the site.

Metal Mine Workers' Union
The Metal Mine Workers' Union developed from the labor unrest in Butte, Montana in 1917. The copper mines of Butte produced a strong union presence in the city; by 1887, all of the city's mines were unionized. This "closed shop" persisted until 1914 when internal struggles destroyed the once powerful Butte Miners' Union of the Western Federation of Miners and opened the mines to corporate control.

Several days after the Speculator disaster, miners began to walk off the job at copper mines all over the city in protest of the poor working conditions. A meeting was organized and the Metal Mine Workers' Union, an unaffiliated and independent union, formed less than two weeks after the Speculator Mine fire. The new union immediately petitioned the Anaconda Copper Company and its subsidiaries for recognition of their union, demanding safer working conditions and wage increases. By the end of June, other trade unions, including the Electricians, Boilermakers, Blacksmiths, and Metal Trades Machinists of Butte, joined the miners in their strike.

The companies resisted the mining union organizers' efforts and chose to work with the other trade unions, acquiescing to many of their demands in hopes of isolating the miners' union and forcing an end to the strike. Around this time, Frank Little, an American labor leader and member of the Industrial Workers of the World, arrived in Butte to support the miners. By the end of July, most of the other trade unions had reached a deal and returned to work. Little, for his support of the miners, was killed by six masked men on August 1, 1917. The miners' union continued to strike through 1917, however, many miners returned to work before its official end. The Metal Mine Workers' Union officially called off the strike on December 18, 1917.

In popular culture
The disaster was memorialized in the song "Rox in the Box" on the album The King is Dead (2011)  by The Decemberists, an indie rock band.  It has also been memorialized in the song "The Miners" by independent Celtic recording artists The Elders and is featured on their album Story Road (2014). For the centennial of the disaster, it was memorialized in the song "Tap 'er Light" by Montana singer songwriter Nick Spear. He performed the song at the Granite Mountain Speculator Mine Memorial above Butte on June 8, 2017.

References

External links
 Metal Mine Workers' Union Strike Bulletins, 1917 (University of Montana Archives)
Granite Mountain/Speculator Mine Fire, Internet Archive
 Michael Punke: Q & A About the North Butte Disaster of 1917, HistoryNewsNetwork
Speculator Mine Memorial
"Looking back at Butte's most deadly mining disaster", KBZK-TV

1917 mining disasters
1917 in Montana
Mining disasters in the United States
Disasters in Montana
Mining in Montana
Silver Bow County, Montana
1917 disasters in the United States